Ben-Rachmiel Labowitch (born 1 July 1980) is a New Zealand former swimmer, who specialized in breaststroke events. Since his mother is a New Zealand citizen, Labowitch claims a dual citizenship which allowed him to try out and make the New Zealand Olympic team. Labowitch is also a former member of North Shore Swim Club under his coach Thomas Ensorg, and a graduate of Drury University in Springfield, Missouri, where he played for the Drury Panthers.

Labowitch qualified for three swimming events at the 2004 Summer Olympics in Athens. He posted FINA B-standard entry times of 1:04.35 (100 m breaststroke) and 2:18.10 (200 m breaststroke) from the Olympic trials in Auckland. On the first day of the Games, Labowitch shared a thirty-sixth place tie with Puerto Rico's Arsenio López in the 100 m breaststroke. Swimming in heat three, he edged out Lithuania's Aurimas Valaitis to break a 1:04 barrier and seize a third seed by 0.12 of a second in 1:03.99. In his second event, 200 m breaststroke, Labowitch challenged seven other swimmers in heat two, including dual citizen Mihail Alexandrov of Bulgaria. He raced to seventh place and thirty-ninth overall in 2:19.25, just 1.15 seconds off his entry time. He also teamed up with Scott Talbot-Cameron, Corney Swanepoel, and Cameron Gibson in the 4 × 100 m medley relay. Swimming the breaststroke leg in heat two, Labowitch recorded a time of 1:03.88, but the New Zealand team missed the final by 5 seconds, finishing in seventh place and twelfth overall with a final time of 3:42.74.

References

External links

1980 births
Living people
New Zealand male breaststroke swimmers
Olympic swimmers of New Zealand
Swimmers at the 2004 Summer Olympics
Swimmers at the 2002 Commonwealth Games
Sportspeople from Fremantle
Sportsmen from Western Australia
Australian people of New Zealand descent
Drury Panthers men's swimmers
Jewish swimmers
New Zealand Jews
Commonwealth Games competitors for New Zealand
20th-century New Zealand people
21st-century New Zealand people